Medan Maimun (Jawi: ماءيمون) is one of 21 districts in the city of Medan, North Sumatra, Indonesia.

Boundaries of the district (Indonesian: kecamatan):
 To the north: Medan Barat
 To the south: Medan Amplas, Medan Johor
 To the east: Medan Kota
 To the west: Medan Polonia

At the 2010 Census, it had a population of 39,581.

Residents 
The majority of residents of the district are Malays, followed by Chinese, Minangkabau and other ethnic groups.

See also 
 Maimoon Palace (ايستان ماءيمون), Palace and landmark of Medan

References 

Districts of Medan